Goodia pubescens, commonly known as golden tip, is a flowering plant in the family Fabaceae. It has yellow pea flowers, bluish-green leaves and found in Victoria and New South Wales.

Description
The leaves are bluish-green, divided into 3 leaflets, smaller leaves are oval to oval-wedge shaped or elliptic, broader at the apex.

Taxonomy and naming
Goodia pubescens was first formally described in 1810 by Sims and the description was published in  Botanical Magazine.The specific epithet (pubescens) means "downy with soft, fine hairs".

Distribution and habitat
Golden tip grows in a variety of situations, dry sclerophyll forests, sheltered valleys and near rainforests.

References

Mirbelioids
Fabales of Australia
Flora of New South Wales
Flora of Victoria (Australia)